This is a list of Proton car models, listed in chronological order of each platform debut.

Perusahaan Otomobil Nasional (Proton) was established in May 1983 through a joint-venture between HICOM and Mitsubishi Motors.

Proton produced its first car, the Saga in July 1985, and its first indigenously designed car, the Waja in May 2000. Since the 2000s, Proton has produced a mix of indigenously designed and rebadged models.

References